The Australia women's national soccer team has represented Australia at the FIFA Women's World Cup on seven occasions in 1995, 1999, 2003, 2007, 2011, 2015 and 2019. Australia will co-host the 2023 FIFA Women's World Cup with New Zealand. The Matildas automatically qualify as co-host. The team also participated in the 1988 FIFA Women's Invitation Tournament, a precursor to the Women's World Cup.

FIFA Women's World Cup record

Record by opponent

1995 FIFA Women's World Cup

Group C

1999 FIFA Women's World Cup

Group D

2003 FIFA Women's World Cup

Group D

2007 FIFA Women's World Cup

Group C

Quarter-finals

2011 FIFA Women's World Cup

Group D

Quarter-finals

2015 FIFA Women's World Cup

Group D

Round of 16

Quarter-finals

2019 FIFA Women's World Cup

Group C

Round of 16

2023 FIFA Women's World Cup

Group B

Goalscorers

 Own goals scored for opponents
 Dianne Alagich (scored for Russia in 2003)

References

 
World Cup
Countries at the FIFA Women's World Cup